West Liberty is a home rule-class city in Morgan County, Kentucky, United States. It is the county seat of Morgan County.  As of the 2010 census, the city population was 3,435. It is located on the banks of the Licking River at the junction of Kentucky Route 7 and U.S. Route 460.

History
By 1816, an early settlement at the town site was called Wells Mills.  When Morgan County was founded in 1823, the settlement was incorporated to become the county seat.  It chose the name West Liberty in the belief that Pikeville, Kentucky would be called "Liberty" when it incorporated.  The town is actually 100 miles east of Liberty, Kentucky.

Three Civil War skirmishes were fought near West Liberty, and much of the town was burned during the war, including the courthouse. It was replaced after the war, and a fourth courthouse was built in 1907.

2012 tornado

On March 2, 2012, West Liberty was hit by an EF-3 tornado which caused extensive damage to the downtown area. This tornado left a swath of damage over a mile wide. Many homes and businesses were heavily damaged or destroyed.  Six people were killed and at least 75 people were injured.  Preliminary assessments from emergency officials and media indicated a path length of 60 miles (97 km), though a National Weather Service survey concluded the tornado travelled 85 miles from Menifee County to Lincoln County, West Virginia. It had the longest track of any tornado in the United States in 2012.

The old courthouse, built in 1907, as well as the new courthouse which was 60% completed were at first, after the tornado, both deemed as a total loss.  However, this determination was in error as both buildings have been restored and finished, respectively.

The tornado had also hit the city of Wellington in Menifee County and was just north of the EF3 tornado that hit Salyersville around 7:00 PM Eastern time that evening.  The tornadoes were the worst in the history of all three of the towns.

Restoration after tornado

Since the 2012 tornado, much progress has been made in West Liberty. Many of the buildings destroyed in the disaster have been either rebuilt to prior state or have been replaced with much better structures. Planning in West Liberty has been continuous since the disaster.

Geography
West Liberty is located at  (37.916320, -83.261386). It is within the state's eastern region foothills, about 20 miles from Cave Run Lake and Daniel Boone National Forest and 15 miles from Paintsville Lake.

Demographics

As of the census of 2000, there were 3,277 people, 696 households, and 446 families residing in the city. The racial makeup of the city was 79.43% White, 18.19% African American, 0.40% Native American, 0.21% Asian, 0.06% Pacific Islander, 0.21% from other races, and 1.50% from two or more races. Hispanic or Latino of any race were 1.25% of the population. (Both the large increase in population after 1990 and the current demographic diversity are the result of the opening of the Eastern Kentucky Correctional Complex).

There were 696 households, out of which 27.6% had children under the age of 18 living with them, 47.7% were married couples living together, 14.1% had a female householder with no husband present, and 35.8% were non-families. 32.8% of all households were made up of individuals, and 14.7% had someone living alone who was 65 years of age or older. The average household size was 2.15 and the average family size was 2.71.

In the city, the population was spread out, with 10.1% under the age of 18, 14.8% from 18 to 24, 44.2% from 25 to 44, 19.4% from 45 to 64, and 11.5% who were 65 years of age or older. The median age was 36 years. For every 100 females, there were 264.5 males. For every 100 females age 18 and over, there were 297.4 males.

The median income for a household in the city was $21,429, and the median income for a family was $30,875. Males had a median income of $25,417 versus $19,464 for females. The per capita income for the city was $11,215. About 25.7% of families and 28.6% of the population were below the poverty line, including 41.6% of those under age 18 and 26.4% of those age 65 or over.

Economy
West Liberty is home to the Eastern Kentucky Correctional Complex. An extended campus of Morehead State University and University of Kentucky's Regional Technology Center are  both located within the town.

The area is also home to Rod and Staff Publishing, a Mennonite Bible literature printing facility, located at Crockett.

Education
Morgan County has four elementary schools. These are Ezel, East Valley, Morgan Central, and Wrigley Elementary. It has one middle school, Morgan County Middle; and one high school, Morgan County High School.

West Liberty has a lending library, a branch of the Montgomery County Public Library.

Arts and culture
West Liberty celebrates the annual Sorghum Festival on the last full weekend of September. The 2015 festival marked the Festival's 45th year, with upwards of 50,000 visitors expected. The Festival features a large variety of Appalachian crafts, folk art, food, and sundry items for sale and/or show. The entire downtown section is cordoned off with main street as the center of activity, a large pavilion type tent is erected to house the art and craft booths.  While only hand-made items are allowed in the main tent, a good variety of roadside vendors and yard sales set up along route 519 from the county line at Cave Run Lake to the flea market at Index, selling everything from antiques, tools, furniture, guns, Case knives, glassware, and collectibles, to homemade quilts, cakes, pies, jams and jellies. Local businesses decorate their window front displays for the occasion with an "1800s" theme, many local homes around the county also participate with awards for both categories. There is also a parade at noon on Saturday, featuring floats, horses, classic cars, motorcycles and displays from local area organizations, churches and schools, with awards and trophies in several categories. The festival also hosts a number of country, bluegrass and rock musicians on two separate stages. The festival is locally known for the "Old Mill", a horse-drawn sorghum mill, as well as the Sorghum Bowl, the local high school's homecoming football game. For those who enjoy Southern classics, there are ample food booths offering the best selections of area restaurants, and the all-time favorites of many festival-goers, funnel cakes and dried apple pies. The area is host to a community of Mennonites, who can be seen near the festival in their 18th century homemade dresses, bonnets and boots, the men are easily recognized by their black trousers and suspenders. The festival is a celebration of the harvest season and the warm rich diversity of the artisans and people who call the picturesque mountains of Morgan County home. The festival is also host to two Civil War reenactments. These reenactments take place Saturday and Sunday of the festival at the soccer field. A Civil-War style camp is set up for spectators.

The Bluegrass Festival began in 1996, and showcases both local and regional bluegrass acts. It takes place at Old Mill Park, and visitors can enjoy a wide selection of food and local vendor booths.

References

External links

 City of West Liberty

Cities in Kentucky
Cities in Morgan County, Kentucky
County seats in Kentucky